Fútbol Club Santa Lucía Cotzumalguapa (known as Santa Lucía), is a Guatemalan football club based in Santa Lucía Cotzumalguapa, Guatemala, that competes in the Liga Nacional de Fútbol de Guatemala.

History

In 2015, Santa Lucía earned promotion from the Guatemalan third division to the Guatemalan second division. In 2018, they earned promotion to the Guatemalan top flight. In 2021, they won the 2021 Clasura of the Guatemalan top flight.

References

Football clubs in Guatemala